Thomas Hoy (c.1750 – 1 May 1822) was an English gardener and botanist employed by the Duke of Northumberland at Syon House in Middlesex in the United Kingdom, a position he held for 40 years. Described as "an experienced botanist and able cultivator" he became a fellow of the Linnean Society of London in 1788 and presented a number of flowering plants to the society from which several species were first formally described including the Australian plants  Acacia suaveolens, Acacia myrtifolia and Goodenia ovata.

He died in Isleworth in 1822 aged 72. Botanist Robert Brown named the plant genus Hoya in his honour describing Hoy as someone  "whose merits as an intelligent and successful cultivator have been long known to the botanists of this country".

References

1822 deaths
English gardeners
Fellows of the Linnean Society of London
Year of birth uncertain